= Valentin Popov =

Bulgarian writer (born 1979)

- Валентин Попов
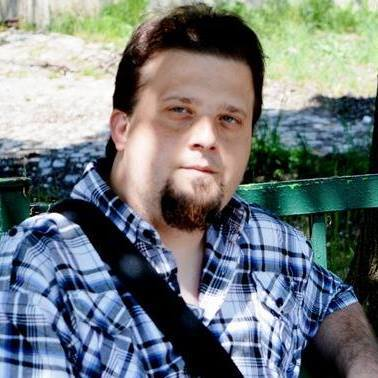
- Valentin Popov
- Born: Valentin Popov; 8 November 1979 (age 46); Pleven, Bulgaria
- Education: Sofia University
- Occupation: Writer
- Writing career
- Pen name: Votan
- Language: Bulgarian
- Years active: 1996 –
- Genres: horror, mystery, fantasy, sci-fi, thriller, poetry

Valentin Popov – Votan is a Bulgarian writer. Popov has five books released in various genres – horror, fantasy, sci-fi, thriller, mystery.

== Biography ==
Valentin Popov was born in 1979 in Pleven. He graduated master's degree at Sofia University. Nowadays he is working in the sphere of tourism. His first publications in periodic literature editions were in 2013 in "Dracus" magazine. In 2014 Popov released his first book "The night against November" (Нощта срещу ноември) and published several short stories in "Dracus", "Trubadurs' gathering" and in the anthology "Inspired by the King" (Вдъхновени от краля). In 2015 his second book "Ashes of darkness" (Пепел от мрак) was published. Popov continued to release prose in periodic editions like "Pencil" journal, "Terra fantastica" and forum "North". Also he participated at anthologies like "Swords in time" (Мечове във времето), "Childhood" (Детство) and "On the wings of the raven" (По крилете на гарвана).

In 2016 Popov released his third book "Brod through the worlds" (Брод през световете) and in 2017 was published his fourth short story collection – "Angels have no wings" (Ангелите нямат криле). In the same year he was published in anthology "Howl" (Вой). In 2018 Popov was a part of the anthology of literature club "Beyond the cover" – "Beyond the cover – year first", and was published in "New asocial poetry" as a poet and novelist.

Valentin Popov is a member of Bulgarian horror writers' club "Lazarus".

== Bibliography ==
=== Books ===
- "The night against November" (Нощта срещу ноември) – 2014
- "Ashes of darkness" (Пепел от мрак) – 2015
- "Brod through the worlds" (Брод през световете) – 2016
- "Angels have no wings" (Ангелите нямат криле) – 2017
- "26 short-stories" (26 истории) – 2019

=== Compilations ===
- "Inspired by the King" (Вдъхновени от краля) – 2014
- "451 degrees of Bradbery" (451 градуса по Бредбъри) – 2015
- "Screams" (Писъци) – 2016
- "Childhood" (Детство) – 2016
- "Swords in time" (Мечове във времето) – 2016
- "On the wings of the raven" (По крилете на гарвана) – 2016
- "The sea in poetry and prose" (Морето в стихове и проза) – 2017
- "Albena" – 2017
- "Howl" (Вой) – 2017
- "Beyond the cover. Year first" (Отвъд кориците. Година първа) – 2018
